The raid on Avtury took place  on 12–13 July 2004, when a large group of Chechen militants assaulted the Chechen village of Avtury.

Attack

After entering the village, separatist guerillas first blocked all entrances to the village and then attacked and seized the buildings of the security forces, inflicting heavy casualties on the defenders. A dozen members of pro-Moscow Chechen police and militia forces who had run out of ammunition were captured at dawn in their base. A car was also ambushed on the road to Avtury and all its passengers were killed.

As the rebels retreated and the government reinforcements arrived, the fighting reportedly continued in the forest outside the village later on the second day.

According to the government sources, at least 18 pro-Moscow fighters and 15 rebels died in the village (20 according to Ramzan Kadyrov). Initially it was claimed eight rebels were killed, and only one body was found at the site according to Memorial. The government declined to disclose the republican and federal losses during the fighting outside of Avtury.

The separatists said they lost five men killed and two missing, while the Russian losses were estimated as at least 45 to 50 killed  (including 15-20 commandos during a fight in the forest near Avtury) and dozens wounded.

See also
2004 Nazran raid
2004 Grozny raid

References 

21st-century mass murder in Russia
Operations of the Second Chechen War
Terrorist incidents in Russia in 2004
2004 in Russia
Battles of the Second Chechen War
Battles involving Chechnya
July 2004 events in Russia
Battles in 2004